Hypsibarbus huguenini is a species of ray-finned fish in the genus Hypsibarbus from south-east Asia and Sumatra.

References 

huguenini
Fish described in 1853